Sipke is a given name. Notable people with the given name include:

Sipke Castelein (born 1941), Dutch rower
Sipke Jan Bousema (born 1976), Dutch presenter and actor
Sipke van der Land (1937–2015), Dutch preacher, writer, teacher and television presenter
Sipke Zijlstra (born 1985), Dutch track cyclist